Freedom's Children was a rock band from Durban, KwaZulu-Natal, South Africa. It was founded in 1966 and lasted until 1971. Its style was Progressive Rock, Psychedelic Rock and Acid Rock. In the center of the band was songwriter and bass player Ramsay MacKay.

Discography 
Albums
 1969: Battle Hymn of the Broken-Hearted Horde (Parlophone)
 1970: Astra (Parlophone)
 1971: Galactic Vibes (Parlophone)

External links 
 South African Rock Encyclopedia
 discogs.com

South African rock music groups